Najat El Hachmi (born in Morocco on July 2, 1979) is a Moroccan-Spanish writer. She holds a degree in Arabic Studies from the University of Barcelona. She is the author of a personal essay on her bicultural identity, and three previous novels, the first of which earned her the 2008 Ramon Llull Prize, the 2009 Prix Ulysse, and was a finalist for the 2009 Prix Méditerranée Étranger.

Life
At the age of 8 she immigrated with her family to Catalonia, Spain. El Hachmi studied Arab literature at the University of Barcelona and currently resides in Granollers.
She began writing when she was twelve years old and has continued ever since, first as entertainment, and later as a means to express concerns or to reflect and re-create her own reality, in the (at least) two cultures to which she belongs.

Career
Her first book, Jo també sóc catalana (I am also Catalan, 2004), was strictly autobiographical, dealing with the issue of identity, and the growth of her sense of belonging to her new country. In 2005, she participated in an event sponsored by the European Institute of the Mediterranean, along with other Catalan writers of foreign descent, including Matthew Tree, Salah Jamal, Laila Karrouch and Mohamed Chaib. During the Frankfurt Book Fair in October 2007, where Catalan culture was the featured guest of honour, she traveled to various German cities to participate in conferences in which she offered her perspective on contemporary Catalan literature. El Hachmi has made frequent appearances in the media, including Catalunya Radio, and the newspaper Vanguardia.

In 2008, she won one of the most prestigious award in Catalan letters, the Ramon Llull prize, for her novel L'últim patriarca (The Last Patriarch). The novel tells the story of a Moroccan who immigrates to Spain, a sometimes despotic patriarch who enters into conflict with his daughter, who breaks with the traditional values of the old country to adapt to the new, modern culture in which she finds herself.

Works
2004  [I am also Catalan]. Columna Edicions. .
2008 . Editorial Planeta. .
English translation: 2010 The Last Patriarch. London: Serpent's tail. .
2008 «L'home que nedava» [The man who swam], short story in El llibre de la Marató: Vuit relats contra les malalties mentals greus. Columna Edicions. .
2011 La caçadora de cossos. Editorial Planeta. .
English translation: 2013 The Body Hunter. Serpent's Tail, 2013.
2015 La filla estrangera, Edicions 62. .
2018 Mare de llet i mel. Edicions 62. .
2021  (the work won the 77th Nadal Prize under the fictional title Intrusas, signed by the pen name of "Cristina López")
2023 Mère de lait et de miel édition Verdier. .

Awards
2008 — Ramon Llull prize for The Last Patriarch
2021 — Nadal Prize for El lunes nos querrán

References

Further reading 
 EVERLY, Kathryn (2011): "Immigrant Identity and Intertextuality in L'ultim patriarca by Najat El Hachmi", Cuaderno Internacional de Estudios Humanísticos y Literatura (CIEHL), vol. 16, pp, 142-50.
 FOLKART, Jessica A. (2013): “Scoring the National Hym(e)n: Sexuality, Immigration, and Identity in Najat El Hachmi’s L’últim patriarca.” Hispanic Review 81.3. pp. 353-76. 
 FOLKART, Jessica A. (2014): Liminal Fiction at the Edge of the Millennium: The Ends of Spanish Identity. Lewisburg, PA: Bucknell University Press. 
 PHILLIPPS, Haarlson y Philip LEVINE (2012): “The Word Hunter: Interview with Najat el Hachmi”, en ID. The best of Barcelona INK, Barcelona, pp. 106-108.
 POMAR-AMER, Miquel (2014): "Voices emerging from the border. A reading of the autobiographies by Najat El Hachmi and Saïd El Kadaoui as political interventions", PLANETA LITERATUR. JOURNAL OF GLOBAL LITERARY STUDIES 1/2014, 33-52, online, http://www.planeta-literatur.com/uploads/2/0/4/9/20493194/pl_1_2014_33_52.pdf  
 SONG, Rosi H. (2014): “Narrating identity in Najat El Hachmi’s L’últim patriarca”, en AIELLO, Lucia, Joy CHARNLEY y Mariangela PALLADINO (eds.), Displaced women. Multilingual Narratives of Migration in Europe. Newcastle upon Tyne: Cambridge Scholars Publishing.
 RICCI, Cristián H. (2010): "L’últim patriarca de Najat El Hachmi y el forjamiento de la identidad amazigh-catalana.” Journal of Spanish Cultural Studies 11.1 pp. 71-91. http://cristianhricci.com/wp-content/uploads/2014/03/journal_spanish_cultural.pdf
 RICCI, Cristián H. (2017): “The Reshaping of Postcolonial Iberia: Moroccan and Amazigh Literatures in the Peninsula.” Hispanófila 180. pp. 21-40. http://cristianhricci.com/wp-content/uploads/2018/02/02_180Ricci.pdf

External links

Najat El Hachmi books
Library Thing

Writers from Catalonia
Exophonic writers
Spanish women writers
University of Barcelona alumni
Living people
1979 births
Moroccan writers
People from Nador
Spanish people of Moroccan-Berber descent